Vallicode-Kottayam is a village in Pathanamthitta district in the state of Kerala, India. Vallicode-Kottayam village is a part of Konni Taluk. Vallicode-Kottayam knows as V. Kottayam in short name. Nedumpara view point is the major tourist attraction at Kottappara, situated at the centre of Vallicode-Kottayam. It is possible to drive the vehicle to the top of the hill, park there and view the scenery from here. Konni Eco Tourism Elephant park is 9 km far from here. Thudiyurulippara is one of the hill station opposite to Kottappara. Hanuman Temple is situated at the top of Thudiyurulippara. One thin and long water fall is visible there near to village office at rainy season. 
A natural canal called 'valiya thode' forming from here and water flows towards Achen covil river. Paddy fields are in the sides of this canal. Pulinilkunnethil kulam, Nenthrappallil kulam, Ambalakkulam are the main ponds in this village. Rubber plantation of Kodumon Plantation under plantation corporation is in the major area of Ezhumon and Aazhakkoottam. 

Komban paramala temple, Chavarukavu temple, Gurumandiram - SNDP School Junction, Gurumandiram - Near Kolappara Junction, Attuvasseril temple are the other main hindu temples. Christian churches are in Elappupara, Thattakkunnu junction Ezhumon and Anthichantha. Kumbha karthika Mahothsavam held Karthika day of 'kumbha' month in Malayalam year is the major festival at Malikappurath Bhagavathi Temple. V. Kottayam junction is 9 km far from district head quarters. 

Private Bus connectivity available from Pathanamthitta and Konni from morning to evening to reach here. Kerala Gramin Bank and Janatha Service co - operative Bank are the main Banking institutions. One SBI ATM at Chavarukavu Junction and two NBFCs are functioning at Junction. Amma hospital at V. Kottayam Junction is the main health care clinic with general medicine doctors, Laboratory and Ambulance service available at 24 hours. Government Primary Health clinic functioning at day time, is situated near to Kottappara Junction. A Post office is with basic facilities functioning near to the market junction. Three Libraries named as Janatha, progressive and vinjanaposhini are conducting cultural activities apart from reading facilities. Enjayes spices is one of the well known spices extraction company located near to Anthichantha. BSNL, Vodafone, Jio mobile networks are covering most of the area. Tea shops and Auto rikshas are available at all major junctions. Poomkavu is the nearby town with petrol pump, ATMs and restaurant facilities. Poomkavu is just 4 km distant from Kottappara Junction.

Demographics
 India census, Vallicode-Kottayam had a population of 14580 with 6822 males and 7758 females. It is located 9 kilometres south east of Pathanamthitta town. Schools - N.S.S. High School, S.N.D.P U.P School, Govt. Primary School.

Places of worship
St. George Kurishupalli Ezhumon, V.Kottayam (https://www.google.co.in/maps/place/St.+George+Kurishupalli/@9.1996623,76.8076354,17z/data=!3m1!4b1!4m5!3m4!1s0x3b061344b721aef1:0x8a1bddaebbd0918e!8m2!3d9.1996623!4d76.8098241?hl=en),

St. Mary's Jacobite Syrian Cathedral
(സെന്റ് മേരീസ് യാക്കോബായ സിറിയൻ കത്തീഡ്രൽ) V.Kottayam (https://www.google.co.in/maps/place/St.+Mary%E2%80%99s+Jacobite+Syrian+Cathedral/@9.2172099,76.7977753,17z/data=!3m1!4b1!4m5!3m4!1s0x3b06149920ed5d59:0x60e9ff70e598e6c9!8m2!3d9.2172099!4d76.799964?hl=en),

St. Thomas Catholic Church V.Kottayam (https://www.google.co.in/maps/place/St.+Thomas+Catholic+Church,+Vallicode+Kottayam,+Kerala+689656/@9.2181959,76.802043,15.5z/data=!4m12!1m6!3m5!1s0x3b061344b721aef1:0x8a1bddaebbd0918e!2sSt.+George+Kurishupalli!8m2!3d9.1996623!4d76.8098241!3m4!1s0x3b061498b0e084b3:0x9ce3fa8aac5c3b6f!8m2!3d9.2166681!4d76.801925?hl=en),

Malikapurathu Bhagavathy Temple V.Kottayam (https://www.google.co.in/maps/place/Malikapurathu+Bhagavathy+Temple/@9.2203844,76.8038351,16.75z/data=!4m12!1m6!3m5!1s0x3b061344b721aef1:0x8a1bddaebbd0918e!2sSt.+George+Kurishupalli!8m2!3d9.1996623!4d76.8098241!3m4!1s0x3b0614a2570adfa5:0xe021961ffeabfe2b!8m2!3d9.2190774!4d76.8061522?hl=en),

St. George Orthodox Church V.Kottayam (https://www.google.co.in/maps/place/St.+George+Orthdox+Church/@9.2009019,76.8102614,15z/data=!4m12!1m6!3m5!1s0x3b06149920ed5d59:0x60e9ff70e598e6c9!2sSt.+Mary%E2%80%99s+Jacobite+Syrian+Cathedral!8m2!3d9.2172099!4d76.799964!3m4!1s0x3b0613561ce70761:0x3bc01e38511168c!8m2!3d9.2111161!4d76.8193862?hl=en),

References

Villages in Pathanamthitta district